Temple Israel is a synagogue in Stockton, California.  It is one of the  oldest Jewish congregations in California.

History

The congregation was founded during the California Gold Rush as a Jewish society called Rhyim Ahovim (Heb. "Loving Friends") by tradition in 1849 but documentably no later than 1850. Other sources say that the congregation was founded in 1851.

The first building, on Miner Ave. between El Dorado and Hunter, was completed on August 28, 1855.  It was a simple, frame structure built on brick foundations of wood that had been shipped around the Horn, since no sawmill yet existed in Stockton.  During the flood of 1861-2 the building flooded with two feet of water, causing the congregation to move it to higher ground on Hunter Street.

References

External links
 Temple Israel Website
 Temple Israel History

1850 establishments in California
Reform synagogues in California
Religious organizations established in 1850
Religious buildings and structures in San Joaquin County, California
Buildings and structures in Stockton, California
Culture of Stockton, California